Alderford is a village and civil parish in the English county of Norfolk, about ten miles (16 km) north-west of Norwich.

The name 'Alderford' derives from the Old English meaning 'alder-tree ford'.

The civil parish has an area of 1.80 square kilometres and in 2001 had a population of 43 in 16 households. At the 2011 Census the population remained less than 100 and is included in the civil parish of Swannington.  For the purposes of local government, the parish falls within the area of the district of Broadland.

War Memorial

St John the Baptist Church holds a memorial to the following soldier who died during the Second World War:

 Sergeant Leslie E. Edwards (1923-1943), Royal Air Force Reserve

References
 Office for National Statistics & Norfolk County Council, 2001. Census population and household counts for unparished urban areas and all parishes. Retrieved 2 December 2005.
http://kepn.nottingham.ac.uk/map/place/Norfolk/Alderford

External links
 
 

Broadland
Villages in Norfolk
Civil parishes in Norfolk